The Soufrière Hills are an active, complex stratovolcano with many lava domes forming its summit on the Caribbean island of Montserrat. After a long period of dormancy, the Soufrière Hills volcano became active in 1995 and has continued to erupt ever since. Its eruptions have rendered more than half of Montserrat uninhabitable, destroying the capital city, Plymouth, and causing widespread evacuations: about two-thirds of the population have left the island. Chances Peak in the Soufrière Hills was the highest summit on Montserrat until the mid-1990s, but it has since been eclipsed by various rising and falling volcanic domes during the recent volcanic activity.

The volcano is andesitic in nature, and the current pattern of activity includes periods of lava dome growth, punctuated by brief episodes of dome collapse which result in pyroclastic flows, ash venting, and explosive eruption. The volcano is monitored by the Montserrat Volcano Observatory. Volcanic gas emissions from this volcano are measured by a Multi-Component Gas Analyzer System, which detects pre-eruptive degassing of rising magmas, improving prediction of volcanic activity.

The Centre Hills in the central part of the island and the Silver Hills in the north are older volcanic massifs related to the subduction zone. There are three main parts of the island: the central zone, subduction and exclusion.

Name
Many volcanoes in the Caribbean are named Soufrière (French: "sulphur outlet"). These include La Soufrière or Soufrière Saint Vincent on the island of Saint Vincent, and La Grande Soufrière on Guadeloupe.

Early history
2460 BC (± 70 years): An explosive eruption formed the crater at the top of the volcano.
 1550 AD (± 50 years): Between 25 and 65 million cubic metres of lava erupted at Castle Peak.

1995–1999 eruption 

Seismic activity had occurred in 1897–1898, 1933–1937, and again in 1966–1967, but the eruption that began on 18 July 1995 was the first since the turn of the 20th century. When pyroclastic flows and mudflows began occurring regularly, the capital, Plymouth, was evacuated, and a few weeks later a pyroclastic flow covered the city in several metres of debris.

The first phreatic explosion in this new period of activity occurred on 21 August 1995, and such activity lasted for 18 weeks until it caused an andesitic lava dome formation. This was initially confined by a sector-collapse scar, first identified in the 1930's and called English's Crater. This period of activity lasted for another 60 weeks, after which there were major dome collapses and two periods of explosive volcanic eruptions and fountain-collapse pyroclastic flows.

A large eruption on 25 June 1997 resulted in the deaths of nineteen people. The island's airport was directly in the path of the main pyroclastic flow and was completely destroyed. Montserrat's tourist industry also collapsed, although it began partially to recover within fifteen years.

The governments of the United Kingdom and Montserrat led the aid effort, including a £41 million package provided to the Montserrat population; however, riots followed as the people protested that the British Government was not doing enough for aid relief. The riots followed a £10 million aid offer by International Development Secretary Clare Short, prompting the resignation of Bertrand Osborne, then Chief Minister of Montserrat, after allegations that he was too pro-British and had not demanded a better offer.

The British destroyer  took a major role in evacuating Montserrat's population to other islands, including Antigua and Barbuda who warned they would not be able to cope with many more refugees. About 7,000 people, or two-thirds of the population, left Montserrat; 4,000 went to the United Kingdom.

Abandoned settlements
The following is a list of Montserrat settlements abandoned by the eruption of the Soufrière Hills volcano:

Amersham
Bethel†
Bramble†
Cork Hill
Dyers†
Elberton
Fairfield†
Farm†
Farrell's†
Farrell's Yard†
Gages
Galway's Estate†
Harris†
Hermitage†
Kinsale
Lee's
Molyneux
Long Ground†
Morris's†
North Olveston (since re-settled)
Old Towne (since re-settled)
Plymouth – the capital of Montserrat, initially evacuated in August 1995; abandoned and destroyed in 1997†
Robuscus Mt†
Saint George's Hill
Saint Patrick's†
Salem (since re-settled)
Soufrière†
Streatham†
Weekes
Woodlands (since re-settled)

†Settlement was destroyed

In addition, the W. H. Bramble Airport was destroyed.

Activity since 1999

On 24 December 2006, streaks of red from the pyroclastic flows became visible. On 8 January 2007, an evacuation order was issued for areas in the Lower Belham Valley, affecting an additional 100 people.

At 11:27 pm local time on Monday 28 July 2008, an eruption began without any precursory activity. Pyroclastic flow lobes reached Plymouth. These involved juvenile material originating in the collapse of the eruption column. In addition, a small part of the eastern side of the lava dome collapsed, generating a pyroclastic flow in Tar River Valley. Several large explosions were registered, with the largest at approximately 11:38 pm. The height of the ash column was estimated at 12,000 m (40,000 ft) above sea level.

The volcano has become one of the most closely monitored volcanoes in the world since its eruption began, with the Montserrat Volcano Observatory taking detailed measurements and reporting on its activity to the government and population of Montserrat. The observatory is operated by the British Geological Survey, under contract to the government of Montserrat.

The journal also showed a link between surface behaviour and the size of the deeper magma chamber.

On 5 February 2010, a vulcanian explosion simultaneously propelled pyroclastic flows down several sides of the mountain, and on 11 February 2010, a partial collapse of the lava dome sent large ash clouds over sections of several nearby islands, including Guadeloupe and Antigua. Inhabited areas of Montserrat itself received very little ash accumulation during either event.

Gallery

See also
 List of Seconds From Disaster episodes

References

External links

 Satellite imagery of 11 February 2010 eruption
 Montserrat Volcano Observatory (MVO) - Current monitoring of the Soufrière Hills Volcano in Montserrat.
 USGS Info on Soufrière Hills Volcano
 2009 activity at Soufrière Hills Volcano, from NASA Earth Observatory
 Smithsonian Institution's Global Volcanism Program: Soufrière Hills

Landforms of Montserrat
Volcanoes of Montserrat
Holocene stratovolcanoes
Active volcanoes
Mountains and hills of British Overseas Territories
Complex volcanoes
20th-century volcanic events
Natural disasters in Montserrat